Pankaj Tripathi (born 28 September 1976) is an Indian actor who works in Hindi cinema and has also appeared in English, Telugu, and Tamil language films. Tripathi has established himself as one of the notable actors in Hindi cinema. He is the recipient of several awards, including a National Film Award, a Filmfare Award, a Screen Award, and an IIFA Award.

Born in Gopalganj, Bihar, Tripathi enrolled himself in the National School of Drama from where he graduated and moved to Mumbai in 2004. Tripathi did an uncredited role in the film Run (2004) and did several minor roles in films such as Raavan (2010) and Agneepath (2012) and in some television series including Powder.

Tripathi rose to fame with his role as Sultan in Anurag Kashyap's Gangs of Wasseypur. Since then, he has appeared in films as a supporting actor, including Singham Returns (2014), Kaala (2018), Extraction (2020), and 83 (2021). Tripathi received widespread critical praise for multiple films, including Fukrey (2013), Masaan (2015), Nil Battey Sannata (2016), Bareilly Ki Barfi (2017), Newton (2017), Fukrey Returns (2017), Stree (2018), Ludo (2020), Kaagaz (2021) and Mimi (2021), the last of which he won the Filmfare Award for Best Supporting Actor. For Newton, Tripathi earned several awards, including a National Film Award – Special Mention. He has starred in several web series, including Mirzapur, Criminal Justice, Yours Truly, and Criminal Justice: Behind Closed Doors.

Early life
Tripathi was born on 5 September 1976 in a Bhojpuri-speaking Hindu Brahmin family in Belsand village of Barauli, Bihar in Gopalganj District in the Indian state of Bihar, to Pandit Benares Tiwari and Hemwanti Tiwari as the youngest of their four children. His father works as a farmer and Hindu priest. Tripathi also worked as a farmer with his father until he was in the 11th standard at school. During the festive seasons, he used to play the role of a girl in his village's local play (natak). He moved to Patna after high school where he studied at Institute of Hotel Management, Hajipur. After his seven years stay in Patna, he moved to Delhi to enroll in the National School of Drama, from where he graduated in 2004.

Career
Tripathi moved to Mumbai in 2004. His first role there was of a politician in a Tata tea Advertisement and then an uncredited role in the film Run. In his early career, he played mostly antagonist roles and became synonymous with gangster characters. He appeared in various Hindi films in minor roles, including Apaharan (2005), Bunty Aur Babli (2005), Omkara (2006), Shaurya (2008), Raavan (2010), Aakrosh (2010), Chillar Party (2011), and Agneepath (2012). In 2008, he also acted in the Bahubali TV series, and later in Powder on Sony TV as well as in a few television serials (daily soaps) such as Gulaal and Sarojini - Ek Nayi Pehal.

In 2012, he played his first major onscreen role as Sultan in the Gangs of Wasseypur films. Tripathi gained popularity following the release of Gangs of Wasseypur films. His first film as a lead actor was the 2017 film Gurgaon, followed by his role in Kaagaz (2021). His 2017 film Newton was India's official entry for the Academy Award in the best foreign film category. Tripathi made his debut in Tamil cinema with the film Kaala, which was released on 7 June 2018.

Even after gaining popularity Tripathi was still appearing in smaller roles in movies like Dabangg 2, Gunday, Singham Returns and Dilwale.

In the year 2017, he appeared in a few major roles in critically acclaimed movies like Bareilly Ki Barfi and Fukrey Returns. In the following year, he appeared in the most profitable movie of that year Stree.

Tripathi also acted alongside Randeep Hooda in Netflix's original Extraction starring Chris Hemsworth in the year 2020. In the same year he got nominated twice for Filmfare Award for Best Supporting Actor for his performances in Gunjan Saxena: The Kargil Girl and Ludo.

In 2021, Pankaj was again nominated twice for Filmfare Award for Best Supporting Actor for his roles in critically acclaimed Mimi and sports drama 83. He won the award for Mimi.

He also starred in leading roles in the 2018 Amazon Prime's web series Mirzapur (season 1 and 2) and the 2019 Netflix web series Sacred Games. He also appeared in the 2019 TV series Criminal Justice as a lawyer. He also appeared in Criminal Justice: Behind Closed Doors in 2020 and Criminal Justice: Adhura Sach in 2022 reprising his role from season 1.

He is set to appear as Former Prime Minister Shree Atal Bihari Vajpayee Ji in the upcoming biopic  Main Atal Hoon, releasing in 2023. He will also be seen in OMG 2 alongside Akshay Kumar and Fukrey 3 in 2023.

Personal life
Tripathi met Mridula during a wedding ceremony in 1993 when they were both in school and then got married on 15 January 2004. They moved to Mumbai after their marriage, and in 2006, had a daughter named Aashi Tripathi.

Filmography

Films

Television

Web series

Awards and nominations

References

External links

 
 
 

1976 births
Living people
Indian male film actors
Male actors in Hindi cinema
Male actors from Bihar
Indian male television actors
Indian male stage actors
People from Gopalganj district, India
National School of Drama alumni
21st-century Indian male actors
Male actors in Telugu cinema
Male actors in Tamil cinema
Special Mention (feature film) National Film Award winners
Screen Awards winners